Group 8 of the UEFA Euro 1972 qualifying tournament was one of the eight groups to decide which teams would qualify for the UEFA Euro 1972 finals tournament. Group 8 consisted of four teams: West Germany, Poland, Turkey, and Albania, where they played against each other home-and-away in a round-robin format. The group winners were West Germany, who finished four points above the Poland.

Final table

Matches

Goalscorers

References
 
 
 

Group 8
West Germany at UEFA Euro 1972
1970–71 in German football
1971–72 in German football
1970–71 in Polish football
1971–72 in Polish football
1970–71 in Turkish football
1971–72 in Turkish football
1970–71 in Albanian football
1971–72 in Albanian football